The Flyin' Buckaroo is a 1928 American silent Western film directed by Richard Thorpe and starring Hal Taliaferro, Jack D'Oise and J.P. Lockney.

Cast
 Hal Taliaferro as Bill Mathews 
 Jack D'Oise as Henry Mathews 
 J.P. Lockney as Mr. Mathews 
 Fanny Midgley as Mrs. Mathews 
 Duane Thompson as Sally Brown 
 Mabel Van Buren as Mrs. Brown 
 Charles K. French as Banker Brown 
 Slim Whitaker as Delno (the bandit)
 Helen Marlowe as City girl 
 Bud McClure as Sheriff

References

Bibliography
 David Quinlan. Quinlan's Film Directors. Batsford, 1999.

External links
 

1928 films
1928 Western (genre) films
1920s English-language films
American aviation films
Films directed by Richard Thorpe
American black-and-white films
Pathé Exchange films
Silent American Western (genre) films
1920s American films